Teemu Hartikainen (born 3 May 1990) is a Finnish professional ice hockey player who is currently playing with Genève-Servette HC of the National League (NL).

Playing career
In nine games with the KalPa U18 squad in 2006–07, the winger tallied five goals and 11 points, adding another three points (2g+1a) in 11 games with the U20 team. During the 2007–08 season, Hartikainen appeared with three different KalPa squads this season. In seven games with the U18 squad, he netted a career-high nine goals and 15 points, adding another 17 points (10g+7a) in 37 games with the U20 KalPa team; he failed to register any points in his lone game with the KalPa SM-Liiga team. H also suited up for six games with the Finland National U18 team, netting two goals and three points at the WJC-18.

Hartikainen was drafted 163rd overall by the Edmonton Oilers in the 2008 NHL Entry Draft. In 2008–09, the Finnish winger continued his hockey career within the KalPa system, appearing in his first full season with the teams SM-Liiga squad. In 51 games, he scored a career-high 23 points (17g+6a), taking the SM-Liiga Most Goals by Rookie and Rookie of the Year awards. He also potted another nine points (3g+6a) at the WJC with Team Finland.

Hartikainen played three seasons in the SM-liiga for KalPa before joining the Oiler American Hockey League affiliate, the Oklahoma City Barons, for the 2010–11 AHL season. Hartikainen was named the AHL's rookie of the month in January 2011. On 14 March 2011, Hartikainen was recalled from the Oklahoma City Barons by the Oilers. On 17 March 2011, Hartikainen made his NHL debut in a 3–1 loss against the Phoenix Coyotes, he recorded an assist on a third period power play goal by Magnus Paajarvi. On 26 March, Hartikainen scored his first NHL goal against Calgary netminder Miikka Kiprusoff in a 5-4 Shootout loss against the Calgary Flames.

On 10 June 2013, after three years of attempting to make it on the Oilers full-time roster, Hartikainen left the Oilers as he signed a contract in the Russian KHL with Salavat Yulaev Ufa. On 31 January 2014, Hartikainen's NHL rights were traded by the Oilers to the Toronto Maple Leafs in exchange for Mark Fraser.

In March 2022, Hartikainen left Salavat Yulaev after the first match the playoffs due to the Russian invasion of Ukraine.

Career statistics

Regular season and playoffs

International

References

External links

1990 births
Living people
Edmonton Oilers draft picks
Edmonton Oilers players
Finnish ice hockey left wingers
Genève-Servette HC players
KalPa players
Oklahoma City Barons players
Ice hockey players at the 2018 Winter Olympics
Ice hockey players at the 2022 Winter Olympics
Olympic ice hockey players of Finland
Medalists at the 2022 Winter Olympics
Olympic gold medalists for Finland
Olympic medalists in ice hockey
People from Kuopio
Salavat Yulaev Ufa players
Sportspeople from North Savo